Synthetic programming is an advanced technique for programming the HP-41C and Elektronika B3-34 calculators, involving creating instructions (or combinations of instructions and operands) that cannot be obtained using the standard capabilities of the calculator.

Some HP-41C instructions are coded in memory using multiple bytes. Some of these sequence of bytes correspond to instructions the calculator is able to execute, but these cannot be entered in the program memory using conventional program entry methods (i.e. using the calculator as described in the user's manual.) Synthetic programming uses a bug in the calculator firmware to enter those byte sequences as a sequence of other instructions, then partially skipping halfway through the first instruction, so that the calculator believes the end of the first instruction is actually the beginning of a new one.

It is not clear if the creators behind the HP-41 were aware of all these "black holes". HP did not officially support these techniques, but probably was intrigued by the strange operations and in some cases allowed enthusiasts to practice in their offices and helped to improve it among a whole sense of curiosity.

References 

 Microcode-Level Calculator Simulation, by Eric Smith, presented at 2004 Hewlett-Packard Handheld Conference in San Jose, California on 26 September 2004

See also
Yeggogology (Cyrillic: "Еггогология")

 Synthetic programming